Cyanea asplenifolia is a flowering plant in the Campanulaceae family. The IUCN has classified the species as critically endangered.  
It is native to the Hawaiian Islands.

Description 
It is a flowering perennial shrub from 1.3 to 2 meters tall.

Taxonomy 
Flowering plant species first discovered by Horace Mann Jr. It was described by Wilhelm B. Hillebrand , in Fl. Hawaiian Isl.: 260 in 1888.

References 

Flora of Hawaii
Plants described in 1888
asplenifolia